Hudson River Wind Meditations is the twentieth and final solo studio album by American musician Lou Reed, released in April 2007 by Sounds True. Hal Willner and Reed produced the album, a collection of meditational music intended to relax the body, mind and spirit, adjunct to Tai chi and bodywork. It is a departure from his regular rock output.

It is named for one of New York City's key features, the Hudson River. The cover photograph is also by Reed.

Track listing

Personnel
Credits are adapted from the Hudson River Wind Meditations liner notes.
Lou Reed – arrangements

Production
Lou Reed – executive co-producer; mixing; photography (album front cover)
Hal Willner – executive co-producer; mixing (at Animal Lab, NYC)
Héctor Castillo – mixing (at Animal Lab, NYC)
Timothy Greenfield-Sanders – photography (Lou Reed portrait, album back cover)
Emily Lazar – mastering engineer (at The Lodge, Greenwich Village)
Mark Mahaney – photo assistance
Chad Morgan – package design
Karen Polaski – package design

References

Lou Reed albums
2007 albums
Albums produced by Lou Reed
Albums produced by Hal Willner
Instrumental albums
Hudson River